Uwe Schulz (born 12 December 1961 in Gießen) is a German politician for Alternative for Germany (AfD) and since 2017 a member of the Bundestag.

Life
Schulz started a study of law in 1982 and quit this without a degree in 1988. He worked for Avis Car Rental in Frankfurt am Main. From 1982 to 1995 Schulz was member of CDU. Since 2013 he is member of AfD. 2015 he signed the Erfurter Resolution. Since 2017 he is member of Bundestag.

His main political interests are in "digitization" of business in Germany.

External links 
 Bundestag Website
 Official Site

References

Living people
1961 births
People from Giessen
Members of the Bundestag for Hesse
Members of the Bundestag 2017–2021
Members of the Bundestag 2021–2025
Members of the Bundestag for the Alternative for Germany